Ballinhassig is a Gaelic Athletic Association club based in the village of Ballinhassig in County Cork, Republic of Ireland.  The club was founded in 1886, and now plays Hurling at Premier Intermediate  level, having won the Cork Premier Intermediate Hurling Championship in 2005, and the Cork Junior Hurling Championship in 2002. 
Stemming from these County Championship wins, Ballinhassig competed in Munster and All-Ireland Club Championships, and have won the following Club Championship Finals: Junior Munster Club Final, Junior All-Ireland Junior Club Hurling Championship Final, Intermediate Munster Club Final; but lost out to Dicksboro, of Kilkenny town, in the All-Ireland Intermediate Club Hurling Championship Final, played in Croke Park. The club also plays Gaelic football, but hurling is much stronger. The club is a member of Carrigdhoun division of Cork GAA.

Ballinhassig also have their own Camogie team, who play at Senior A level.

The underage boys and girls teams compete in the South East League and Championship (from under 10s to under 16's ).

History
The club was founded in 1886. The club has participated in many great games down through the years. In its early days they would come together (sometimes) with Ballygarvan to form Owenabue Rovers. They lost a Junior County Hurling Final in 1954 but were successful in winning the same competition in 1965. In 1971 Ballinhassig were again defeated in the County Junior Hurling final by Bandon. However the rest of the 1970s proved to be most successful, winning a County Junior in 1973 captained by John Kevin Coleman  and Intermediate Titles in both 75 captained by John Joe Spillane and 77 by Tim F Hayes. The club again reached an Intermediate Final in 1983 but were defeated by Cloughduv.
The decision was taken to re-grade to Junior in 1990 where many South-East Titles were won. The club reached the County Junior Hurling Final in 1995 and 2000 but were defeated by Killeagh and Nemo Rangers. However success came in 2002 with victory over Fr O'Neills captained by James Ahern. Ballinhassig went on to capture Munster Junior Club vs Ballinahinch of Tipperarry and All Ireland Junior Club vs Black and Whites of Kilkenny also in this year, and went on to win the Premer Intermediate Title in 2005 against Aghada captained by Martin Coleman, Jnr  , going on to win the Munster title after beating Ballyduff Upper of Waterford also reached the All Ireland Final of this competition losing to Dicksboro of Kilkenny at Croke Park in a tight contest. While competing in Senior Ranks the club won two senior League Titles in 2007 vs Glen Rovers  and 2008 vs Newtownshandrum. Ballinhassig re-took their place in the Senior Hurling Championship in 2013 after winning their fourth Premier Intermediate Hurling Championship, defeating Bandon in the 2012 Premier Intermediate Hurling County Championship final in Páirc Uí Chaoimh.  In 2012 Ballinhassig also won their first ever South East Junior A Football Championship, defeating Tracton after a replay in the South East Final played in Carrigaline.About near a decade later in 2021, they would eventually lose the County Final to Boherbue played in Páirc Uí Choaimh.

Honours
 All-Ireland Junior Club Hurling Championship (1): 2003
 All-Ireland Intermediate Club Hurling Championship (0): (Runners-Up 2006)
 Munster Junior Club Hurling Championship (1): 2002
 Munster Intermediate Club Hurling Championship (1): 2005
 Cork Premier Intermediate Hurling Championship (2): 2005, 2012
 Cork Intermediate Hurling Championship (2): 1975, 1977 (Runners-Up 1983)
 Cork Intermediate Football Championship (0): (Runners-Up 1929) (as Owenabue Rovers)
 Cork Junior Hurling Championship (3): 1965, 1973, 2002  (Runners-Up 1954, 1971, 1995, 2000, 2014)
 Cork Junior Football Championship (0): (Runners-Up 2021)
 Cork Under-21 Hurling Championship (0): (Runners-Up 2009)
 Cork Minor A Hurling Championship (2): 2002, 1987 (Runners-Up 1998)
 Carrigdhoun Junior Hurling Championship (29): 1934, 1946, 1948, 1953, 1954, 1955, 1956, 1960, 1961, 1962, 1964, 1965, 1960, 1971, 1973, 1991, 1992, 1994, 1995, 1996, 1998, 2000, 2002, 2006, 2009, 2011, 2012, 2013, 2014
 Carrigdhoun Junior Football Championship (5): 1928, 2012, 2015, 2019, 2021
 Cork Senior Hurling League (2): 2007, 2008
 Cork Intermediate Hurling League (4): 1984, 2005, 2014, 2018 
 Cork Junior Football League (1): 2019 
 Cork Minor Non Exam Hurling (1): 2010 
 South-East Under 21 "A" Hurling Championship Winners (7) 1979, 2000, 2001, 2004, 2006, 2009, 2015 
 South-East Under 21 "B" Football Championship Winners (2) 2011, 2016

Notable players
 John Kevin Coleman
 Martin Coleman: 4 time All-Ireland Medalist and 4 All-Stars
 Martin Coleman, Jnr
 Tim F. Hayes: Gaelic Footballer
 Brendan Lombard: Captain of Cork winning the All-Ireland Intermediate in 2003
 Patrick Collins
 Ger Collins
 Con Cottrell: 5 time All-Ireland Medalists
 Seán McCarthy: 1992 All-Star Winner 
 Fintan O'Leary

References

External links
Ballinhassig GAA site

Gaelic games clubs in County Cork
Hurling clubs in County Cork
Gaelic football clubs in County Cork